Tresaith (otherwise Tre-saith) is a coastal village in Ceredigion, Wales, between Aberporth and Llangranog. It is linked to the former by a two-mile section of the Ceredigion Coast Path, part of the Wales Coast Path. Tresaith is within the Ceredigion Heritage Coast which  offers extensive walking and views. There is an abundance of wildlife and flora. Many kinds of seabirds can be spotted and regular sightings of grey seals and dolphins are made.

History
Until the mid-19th century, Tresaith consisted of two dwellings; a thatched cottage and the Ship Inn. Shipowners, the Parry family, ran the inn. Their first vessel, the New Hope, was built on the beach in 1827. Later, several smacks of about 25 tons operated from Tresaith, bringing in coal, limestone and culm. In the last few decades of the 19th-century the village became popular as a seaside holiday destination and contemporary newspapers referred to it as the Second Brighton.

Attractions

 Tresaith is a European Blue Flag beach. In 2012, the beach was also awarded a Seaside Award. Lifeguards are normally on duty at peak seasons. Tresaith is a popular location for surfing.
 Dolphins can be sighted most summer days. Cardigan Bay has a resident bottle-nosed dolphin population. 
 The Waterfall, where the River Saith cascades over the cliffs into the sea.
 Active sailing club, the "Tresaith Mariners" with a mixed fleet of dinghies and catamarans.

Gallery

References

External links 

Villages in Ceredigion
Coast of Ceredigion
Beaches of Ceredigion